The Female is a 1924 American silent drama film directed by Sam Wood and starring Betty Compson, Warner Baxter, and Noah Beery. It is based on the novel Dalla, the Lion Cub by Cynthia Stockley.

Cast

Preservation
With no copies of The Female located in any film archives, it is a lost film.

References

External links

1924 films
American silent feature films
Films directed by Sam Wood
Lost American films
Films based on British novels
Silent American drama films
1924 drama films
American black-and-white films
1924 lost films
Lost drama films
1920s American films